GuRu is a 2018 autobiography and life guide from American drag queen and entrepreneur RuPaul. Released in October 2018 by HarperCollins, with a foreword by actress and author Jane Fonda, included are quotes, phrases, advice and insight to help readers navigate the “chaos of modern life”, such as self-love, harnessing one’s inner critic, and finding your tribe. Her previous books were Lettin' It All Hang Out (1995), an autobiography, and Workin' It! RuPaul's Guide to Life, Liberty, and the Pursuit of Style (2010).

She was inspired to write the book to reach LGBTQ youth who often face ostracism and rejection from their parents and families, and society, because of their sexuality and gender identity. RuPaul’s parents divorced when she was very young and the experience scarred her for years, during which she had to grow through the pain. In an interview with WBUR, RuPaul notes the reason she wrote the book was to give young LGBTQ people a touchstone for their lives. She explained that the queens who competed in RuPaul's Drag Race has similar family experiences of rejection, and talked about those stories inspiring the viewers in dealing with their own problems. RuPaul sees LGBTQ people allegorically as lotus flowers growing through adversity; born under mud, growing through water, and then to reach air and light of the sun.

See also 

 Performativity
 Social construction of gender

Notes

Reference 

2018 non-fiction books
American autobiographies
HarperCollins books
LGBT autobiographies
Works by RuPaul
2010s LGBT literature
LGBT literature in the United States
African-American autobiographies
Self-help books